The Granville-Avranches-Sourdeval tramway was a  long  gauge railway from Condé-sur-Vire via Granville to Avranches in the Manche department of the Normandy region, which operated from 1908 to 1935.

History 
The line opened in 1908, at a similar time as the Condé-Granville tramway and the Coutances-Lessay metre gauge railway. These lines were operated by the Société des Chemins de Fer de la Manche (CFM) until 1935.

References 

Metre gauge railways in France
Tram transport in France
Railway lines opened in 1908